A Year at the Movies is the major label debut by the Canadian alternative/punk group Social Code, the band formerly known as Fifth Season. It was released in May 2004 in various countries, through Interscope. The first single from the album, "Beautiful", received significant play on radio stations throughout Canada. A music video was also released for the second single, "Whisper to a Scream (Birds Fly)", a cover of post-punk band The Icicle Works.

Track listing

Personnel
Travis Nesbitt – lead vocals
David Hesse – lead & rhythm guitars
Logan Jacobs – bass
Ben Shillabeer – drums, percussion

References

Social Code albums
2004 debut albums
Interscope Records albums